Red Wheat is a 1970 Yugoslavian drama film directed by Živojin Pavlović. It was entered into the 21st Berlin International Film Festival.

Cast
 Boris Bruncko – (as Boris Brunčko)
 Olga Ftitc – (as Olga Fritz)
 Irena Glonar – Tunika
 Majda Grbac – Hana
 Angelca Hlebce – Aktivistka Liza
 Roman Lovric – (as Roman Lavrač)
 Milena Muhic – (as Milena Muhič)
 Stane Potisk – (as Stanko Potisk)
 Majda Potokar – Zefa
 Janez Rohacek – (as Janez Rohaček)
 Rade Šerbedžija
 Alja Tkaceva – (as Alja Tkačev)
 Franjo Vicar – (as Franjo Vičar)

External links

1970 films
Serbo-Croatian-language films
1970 drama films
Films directed by Živojin Pavlović
Slovenian drama films
Yugoslav drama films
Films set in Yugoslavia